The British Virgin Islands competed at the 11th Pan American Games held in Havana, Cuba from August 2 to August 18, 1991.

Results by event

See also
 British Virgin Islands at the 1992 Summer Olympics

Nations at the 1991 Pan American Games
P
1991